Proustia is a genus of shrubs in the family Asteraceae, native to the Greater Antilles.

The genus is named for Dr. Beryl Simpson, of the University of Texas.

 Species
 Berylsimpsonia crassinervis (Urb.) B.L.Turner - Hispaniola
 Berylsimpsonia vanillosma (C.Wright) B.L.Turner - Cuba, Haiti, Puerto Rico

References

Nassauvieae
Asteraceae genera